Mbaye is a Senegalese given name that is also used as a family name.

Use as a given name

 Alioune Mbaye Nder (born 1969), Senegalese singer
 Annette Mbaye d'Erneville (born 1926), Senegalese writer
 Mbaye Diagne (died 1994), Senegalese Army officer
 Mbaye Dieye Faye, singer and percussionist from Senegal
 Mbaye Leye (born 1982), football striker from Senegal

Use as a family name
 Jimi Mbaye, Senegalese guitarist
 Kéba Mbaye (1924-2007), Senegalese judge
 Ibrahima Mbaye, Senegalese footballer
 Abdoul Mbaye, prime minister of Senegal
 Cheikh M'Baye, Senegalese footballer
 Maodo Malick Mbaye, Senegalese footballer
 Malick Mbaye, Senegalese footballer
 Ismaila Mbaye, Senegalese drummer

See also
 Mbay (disambiguation)

Senegalese given names
Senegalese surnames